Jung Yoon-suk (born 18 July 1981) is a South Korean artist and film director.

Personal life
Born in 1981, Jung majored in Plastic Arts at the Korea National University of Arts.

Filmography 
Burning Mirage (short film, 2009) - director
The Home of Stars (short documentary, 2010) - director
Dusts (short film, 2011) - director
Jam Docu KANGJUNG (documentary, 2011) - director, editor
Non-fiction Diary (documentary, 2013) - director, producer, editor, cinematographer
Bamseom Pirates Seoul Inferno (documentary, 2017) - director

References

External links 
 
 
 

1981 births
Living people
South Korean film directors